{{Infobox university
 | name                   = Luther College
 | image                  = 
 | image_size             = 150
 | motto                  = Soli Deo Gloria
 | motto_lang             = la
 | mottoeng               = To God alone be the Glory
 | established            = 
 | type                   = Private college
 | religious_affiliation  = Evangelical Lutheran Church in America
 | endowment              = $207.4 million (2021)
 | president              = Jenifer K. Ward (2019 - Current)
 | provost                = Brad Chamberlain (2022 - Current)
 | undergrad              = 1,744
 | city                   = Decorah, Iowa
 | state                  = Iowa
 | postalcode             = 52101
 | country                = U.S.
 | campus                 =  main campus, an additional  of field research areas
 | athletics_affiliations = NCAA Division III - ARC
 | sports_nickname        = Norse
 | academic_affiliations  = Associated Colleges of the Midwest
 | website                = 
 | dean                   = Ashley Benson
 | colors                 =   Blue & white

}}

Luther College is a private Lutheran liberal arts college in Decorah, Iowa.  Established as a Lutheran seminary in 1861 by Norwegian immigrants, the school today is an institution of the Evangelical Lutheran Church in America. The upper campus was listed as the Luther College Campus Historic District on the National Register of Historic Places in 2021.

History
On October 10, 1857, the Norwegian Evangelical Lutheran Church (NELC) created a seminary to supply ministers for Norwegian congregations in the Upper Midwest. Until the seminary was established in 1861, students studied at Concordia Seminary in St. Louis, Missouri. On October 14, 1859, the Rev. Peter Laurentius Larsen was appointed professor to the Norwegian students at Concordia by the NELC.

Upon the closing of the seminary in April 1861, at the start of the Civil War, the NELC decided to open its own college that fall in a former parsonage at Halfway Creek, Wisconsin, just north of La Crosse, Wisconsin, and close to present-day Holmen, Wisconsin. On September 1, 1861, classes officially began with an enrollment of 16. The following year classes moved to Decorah, Iowa, with NELC Pastor Ulrik Vilhelm Koren successfully arranging the college's relocation and permanent settlement.

In 1866, a group of students signed a "bill of rights" criticizing the rigid schedule, the rules about going downtown, the lack of windows in some of the sleeping rooms, and the woodcutting and shoe-shining chores, concluding that "there was not enough freedom." The leader of the group, 18-year-old Rasmus Anderson, was expelled. This event was viewed as a rebellion and "the worst of sins" by the pastors assembled in a pastoral conference shortly after.

In 1905, Carlo A. Sperati, an 1888 graduate of Luther, became the music director of the college and developed the Luther College Concert Band, founded in 1878, on the model of the wind ensemble pioneered by John Philip Sousa. Under Sperati, the band undertook several tours of Europe, their first in 1914, earning international acclaim for their musical talent. Sperati remained on the faculty until his death in 1945.

In 1932, Luther College dropped its mandatory study of the classics and embraced the modern concept of the liberal arts education. Due to financial constraints associated with the Great Depression, the college decided to admit women as students in 1936. During the 1960s Luther constructed several new campus buildings and adopted a 4-1-4 semester schedule (two 4-month semesters with a 1-month session between them).

In 1964, Luther's museum collection became separate from the college and was established as the Norwegian-American Museum. Now known as Vesterheim Norwegian-American Museum, it is the largest and most comprehensive museum in the United States devoted to a single immigrant group. Nordic Fest, started in 1967, grew from Luther College Women's Club's annual celebration of Norwegian Constitution Day.

Campus
Luther lies at the edge of Decorah, a small town situated in the hilly driftless region of the Upper Midwest. The Upper Iowa River flows through the lower portion of the nearly  central campus. The college owns an adjoining  devoted to environmental research, biological studies, and recreation.

Luther student housing includes residence halls (Miller Hall, Dieseth Hall, Ylvisaker Hall, Farwell Hall, Brandt Hall, Larsen Hall, and Olson Hall) and several houses, townhouses, and apartment buildings. Ninety-five percent of Luther students live on campus all four years. One 259-student dormitory opened in 1991, with a cost of $7,000,000. Designed by Hammel Green & Abramson Inc., it has nine stories.

In the 2000s, the college engaged in extensive building projects. A renovation of residence halls and the Dahl Centennial Union was completed in 2006, and Sampson Hoffland Laboratories, an extension of Valders Hall of Science, was completed in 2008.

The Center for Faith and Life is Luther's largest and primary performing arts facility.

In 2021, the historic upper campus was listed as a historic district on the National Register of Historic Places. At the time of its nomination it consisted of 33 resources, which included 17 contributing buildings, four contributing objects, seven non-contributing buildings, and five non-contributing objects. One of the contributing buildings, Koren Hall, was individually listed on the National Register in 1984.

Academics
Luther is an exclusively undergraduate institution, enrolling 1,744 students as of fall 2021 and employing 177 full-time faculty in 2015–2016.  The college is accredited by the Higher Learning Commission.  It is a member institution of the Associated Colleges of the Midwest and the Annapolis Group.

Among private liberal arts colleges, Luther was ranked 102nd by the 2021 edition of U.S. News & World Reports college and university rankings.

Luther enrolled 624 first-year students for the entering class of 2015. Thirty-one percent of first-year students were in the top 10 percent of their high school class, the average high school grade point average was 3.7, and the interquartile range for ACT scores was 23–29. Tuition and fees are shown as $61,500 for 2023 - 2024, with 98 percent of students receiving need- and/or merit-based financial aid.

Its most popular majors, by 2021 graduates, were:
Registered Nursing/Registered Nurse (39)
Business Administration & Management (31)
Biology/Biological Sciences (29)
Research & Experimental Psychology (27)
Music (19)
Social Work (18)
Political Science & Government (17)

Music

Luther has a number of music organizations that tour and sell recordings internationally. The Nordic Choir, Concert Band, Symphony Orchestra and Jazz Orchestra are the college's four internationally touring ensembles, which have performed in many of the major concert halls and music centers of Europe, as well as Russia, China, Japan, Mexico, Brazil, and the Caribbean. About 40 percent of the students participate in at least one of the college's six choirs, three concert bands, three string orchestras, and two jazz ensembles. "Christmas at Luther," Luther's annual Christmas concert, is broadcast nationwide each year. The concert broadcast is updated annually.

Much of Luther's musical heritage can be largely attributed to the influence of two long-serving individuals. The 40-year tenure of Dr. Carlo A. Sperati, Class of 1888, fostered the college's Lutheran musical tradition beginning in 1905 and developed the Luther College Concert Band into one of the first nationally touring music ensembles. Sperati's Concert Band quickly achieved national acclaim, and famed bandmaster John Philip Sousa canceled a performance of his own touring ensemble just so that he could attend a performance of the Luther College Concert Band, which was scheduled to appear in a nearby city.

Sperati's foundation was built upon by Weston Noble '43, himself a student of Sperati. Following three years of U.S. Army enlistment in World War II, Noble returned to his alma mater to conduct the Concert Band and the Nordic Choir, direct Christmastime performances of George Frederic Handel's Messiah, and teach in the Music Department. Noble's bands (which he conducted until 1973) and choirs completed coast-to-coast tours and international appearances. Ensembles under his direction performed solo concerts at such venues as Lincoln Center and Town Hall in New York; the Kennedy Center in Washington, DC; the Mormon Tabernacle in Salt Lake City; Dorothy Chandler Pavilion and the Walt Disney Concert Hall in Los Angeles; Orchestra Hall at Symphony Center in Chicago; Orchestra Hall and the State Theatre in Minneapolis; and the Ordway Center for the Performing Arts in Saint Paul. Under Noble's direction, Luther ensembles also appeared at historic cathedrals and concert halls throughout Europe, Russia, and Scandinavia, as well as on the programs of many national conventions of the American Bandmasters Association, the American Choral Directors Association, and the Music Educators National Conference.

The Nordic Choir was featured in the film The Joy of Bach, and in four weekly international broadcasts of The Hour of Power from the Crystal Cathedral in Garden Grove, California. Weston Noble retired from the faculty at the close of the academic year in 2005, having served continuously for 57 years, from 1948 to 2005. A new film documentary To This Day about the first international tour of the Nordic Choir in 1967 was released in October 2017.

The Nordic Choir, which tours internationally, is one of the five choral ensembles at Luther. Collegiate Chorale is a mixed choir composed of juniors and seniors. Cathedral Choir is a mixed choir that draws exclusively from the sophomore class. Aurora and Norskkor, featuring soprano-alto and tenor-bass voices, respectively, are composed entirely of first-year students. In addition to the five choirs, students have opportunities with Collegium Musicum and Vocal Jazz Ensemble. Collegium Musicum is an early music ensemble specializing in the music of the medieval, Renaissance, and baroque periods. The ensemble focuses more on instrumental works but incorporates vocal music throughout the academic year. The ensemble is open to singers of all years at Luther. The Vocal Jazz Ensemble is open to all students and often performs jointly with Luther's instrumental jazz ensembles.

Symphony Orchestra, Jazz Orchestra, and Concert Band also tour internationally. Symphony Orchestra establishes residency in Vienna every four years, and Jazz Orchestra has toured in the Caribbean and Brazil. Concert Band travels to Japan and China following the spring semester every four years. Other instrumental ensembles include Chamber Orchestra, Philharmonia, Jazz Band, Varsity Band, Brass Ensemble, and Wind and Percussion Ensemble.

Luther students also participate in faculty-coached student chamber ensembles ranging from piano trios to a full flute choir.  Some of these ensembles include the Luther Ringers student handbell choir; the 40+ member Trombone Choir; five student-led, small-group a cappella ensembles; the Luther College Balalaika ensemble; and the student-led Luther Gospel Choir.

In 1996, musician Dave Matthews appeared in concert with Tim Reynolds at Luther College in the Center for Faith and Life, which resulted in their 1999 album Dave Matthews and Tim Reynolds Live at Luther College.

In 2002, the Empire Brass, with college organist William Kuhlman, appeared in concert and recorded an album,  Baroque Music for Brass and Organ, in the Center for Faith and Life. In 2008, musician Ben Folds appeared for his second time in concert at Luther College in the Center for Faith and Life.

Study abroad
Each year, between 400 and 500 Luther students expand their worldviews through international study, ranking Luther among the top baccalaureate colleges in the nation for the percentage of students who study abroad prior to graduation—over two-thirds. Over the years, more than 150 Luther faculty have led Luther students on programs in more than 70 countries.

Athletics
The Luther Norse have been a member of the Iowa Intercollegiate Athletic Conference (now known as the American Rivers Conference (A-R-C)) since its founding in 1922. Luther competes in 11 men's and 10 women's intercollegiate athletic programs.  Since joining the Iowa Conference, Luther has won 237 IIAC titles.

Three hundred thirty-eight All-American honors have been earned by Luther student-athletes, and twenty-nine athletes have been crowned national champions. Sixty-eight student-athletes have been awarded the CoSIDA Academic All-American honor, and forty-two have received the distinguished NCAA Postgraduate Scholarship.

Since 1993–1994, the first year of the award, 1,929 academic all-conference honors have been earned by Luther student-athletes. To earn academic all-conference honors, a student-athlete must have a grade point average of 3.50 or greater on a 4.0 scale, have attended the school for a full year, and have competed in a varsity sport.

Approximately 25 percent of Luther students participate in one of the 21 varsity sports offered. A large majority of the study body participates in intramural activities which vary by semester and is offered by the Recreational Services program.  Outdoor Recreational Services is an extension of the Recreational Services program in which students/staff lead outdoor activities such as slacklining, kayak trips on the Upper Iowa River, fall break trips, rock climbing, and whitewater rafting.

Varsity sports

Club sports

Outdoor facilities
Carlson Stadium: 5,000 seats; blue turf football field; eight-lane, 400-meter polyurethane track with two-directional approaches for pole vault and all jumping events; two shot put circles; discus/hammer cage; and multi-directional javelin-throwing areas.

Other outdoor facilities include 12 tennis courts, baseball and softball diamonds with enclosed dugouts, lighted soccer field, cross-country running course, intramural rugby, soccer, and ultimate frisbee pitches, fitness trail, ropes course, and room for cross country skiing.

Indoor facilities
The Regents Center Main Gymnasium: three full-sized basketball courts and seating capacity for 2,600.  Used for practice and playing of volleyball and men's and women's basketball, and as the competition site venue for wrestling. Norse basketball teams also have access to full-sized cedar basketball court in the north gym and two basketball courts in the Sports and Recreation Center.

Sports and Recreation Center: newly renovated in 2022 200-meter, six-lane polyurethane-surface track; easily accessible elevated walkway allowing up to 600 spectators; six tennis courts; year-round training facility for baseball, softball, soccer, tennis and football.

Legends Fitness Center:  training center with cardiovascular-conditioning machines; free weights; weight machines; climbing wall; computer lab; and social area.

The Aquatic Center features a 25-yard, eight-lane pool with separate one-meter and three-meter diving well and a shallow area for swimming lessons, adaptive physical education classes, and water aerobics. It also includes three-meter springboards, state-of-the-art timing equipment, a large LED scoreboard, and seating for 280 spectators. The pool was built using LEED design standards to meet Luther College's goal of sustainability.

Notable alumni

Torger Juve, 1866 - Wisconsin State Legislature
Hans Gerhard Stub, 1866 - American Lutheran theologian and bishop of the Norwegian Lutheran Church in America
Thorbjorn N. Mohn, 1870 - first president of St. Olaf College
Herbjørn Gausta, 1872 - American artist best known for his landscape paintings
Realf Ottesen Brandt, 1877 - Lutheran minister
Ole Grönsberg, 1877 - second president of Pacific Lutheran University
J. C. M. Hanson, 1882 - librarian
Haldor Johan Hanson, 1883 - hymn writer, publisher, and author
Ludvig Hektoen, 1883 - pathologist
Ingebrikt Grose, 1885 - first president of Concordia College
Howard A. Knutson, 1951 - Minnesota lawyer and Minnesota State Representative
Laurits S. Swenson, B.A. 1886, M.A. 1889 - United States ambassador to Denmark, Switzerland, Norway, and the Netherlands
Ole J. Kvale, 1890 - U.S. representative from Minnesota
Jacob Aall Ottesen Preus, 1903 - 20th Governor of Minnesota
Norman Brunsdale, 1913 - 24th Governor of North Dakota and U.S. senator from North Dakota
V. Trygve Jordahl, 1922 - Luther College Board of Regents, district president and director of Evangelical Lutheran Church 
Marv Olson, c. 1928 - Major League baseball player
Robert E. A. Lee, 1942 - head of the Lutheran Church's film production operations
Adolph Herseth, 1943 - principal trumpet of the Chicago Symphony Orchestra
Robert Preus, 1944 - Lutheran theologian and president of Concordia Theological Seminary, Fort Wayne, Indiana
Jerry Rosholt, 1948 - journalist and author
Ole Ivar Lovaas, 1951 - Norwegian-American clinical psychologist and professor at the University of California, Los Angeles
Brad Steiger, 1957 - writer and paranormal researcher
Phyllis Yes, 1963 - artist
Dave Senjem, 1964 - Minnesota State Senator; minority leader; majority leader
John Lehman, 1967 - Wisconsin State Senator
Dean Johnson, 1969 - Minnesota Senate majority leader (DFL), brigadier general, chief of National Guard Chaplains
Bruce Tammen, 1971 - artistic director and conductor of Chicago Chorale, recipient of Weston Noble Choral Award for outstanding service in vocal music education
Cheryl Browne, 1972 - Miss Iowa 1970, first African-American contestant in the Miss America pageant
Gregory R. Dahlberg, 1973 - United States Under-Secretary of the Army; Senior vice president Lockheed Martin
Donovan W. Frank, 1973 - federal judge for the United States District Court for the District of Minnesota
Marty Haugen, 1973 - composer of sacred music
Michael Osterholm, 1975 - professor and director of the Center for Infectious Disease Research and Policy
Brian Rude, 1977 - Wisconsin State Assembly
Dagfinn Høybråten, 1979 - secretary general, Nordic Council of Ministers; board chair of the GAVI Alliance
Brian Andreas, 1979 - writer, painter, sculptor, publisher; Luther College Distinguished Service Award recipient
Arne Sorenson, 1980 - president and chief executive officer of Marriott International
Jim Nussle, 1983 - U.S. Congressman from Iowa; director of the Office of Management and Budget for President George W. Bush
Leon Lillie, 1984 - Minnesota State Representative
Callista Gingrich née Bisek, 1988 - wife of Newt Gingrich
Tod Bowman, 1989 - Iowa State Senator
Drew Curtis, 1995 - founder and administrator of Fark
Aaron Sheehan, 1998 - Grammy award-winning tenor

Notable faculty
Marcia Bunge, Lutheran theologian
Herbjørn Gausta, artist
Gerhard Forde, Lutheran theologian
A. Thomas Kraabel, classics scholar
Weston Noble, music educator
Dean Schwarz, artist specializing in ceramics
Henry O. Talle, Congressman from Iowa's 4th congressional district
Oscar Tingelstad, president of Pacific Lutheran College

See also
Center for Faith and Life
List of presidents of Luther College

 References 

Further reading
Bothne, Gisle C. J. History of Luther College'' (Decorah, IA. Fortfatteren.  1897)

External links

 
Liberal arts colleges in Iowa
Educational institutions established in 1861
Education in Winneshiek County, Iowa
Buildings and structures in Winneshiek County, Iowa
Tourist attractions in Winneshiek County, Iowa
Norwegian-American culture in Iowa
1861 establishments in Iowa
Private universities and colleges in Iowa
National Register of Historic Places in Winneshiek County, Iowa
University and college buildings on the National Register of Historic Places in Iowa
Historic districts on the National Register of Historic Places in Iowa